Digitivalva pulicariae is a moth of the family Acrolepiidae. It is found in most of Europe, except Portugal, Fennoscandia, the Baltic region and Poland.

The wingspan is about 13 mm. Adults are on wing from August to, after overwintering, May of the following year.

The larvae feed on Pulicaria dysenterica. They mine the leaves of their host plant. The mine initially has the form of a short corridor that starts at the midrib or the leaf base. It later becomes a whitish or brownish full depth blotch. The frass is deposited in irregularly dispersed grains. A single larva creates several mines. Pupation takes place outside of the mine in a reticulate cocoon, under a leaf or among litter. The larvae are yellowish green with a brown head. They can be found from June to July.

References

Acrolepiidae
Moths described in 1956
Moths of Europe
Moths of Asia